How Does Your Garden Grow? is an Australian play by Jim McNeil. It was his first full-length work and was written while he was a prisoner in Bathurst Prison.

References

External links
How Does Your Garden Grow? at AusStage

Australian plays
1974 plays